Tairia Mims Flowers (born January 9, 1981) is an African-American former collegiate All-American, medal-winning Olympian, softball player and current head coach at Loyola Marymount. She played college softball as a third basemen for the UCLA Bruins from 2000 to 2003, winning a national championship in 2003 and ranking top-five in school career RBIs and home runs. Flowers also helped them to two runner-up finishes and was named a three-time All-Tournament honoree. Flowers won a gold and silver medal as part of Team USA at the 2004 Summer Olympics and 2008 Summer Olympics.

Early life and college career
Born Tairia Mims in Tucson, Arizona, Flowers graduated from Salpointe Catholic High School in 1999 and played on the UCLA Bruins softball team from 2000 to 2003 at first base and catcher. Helping UCLA make the championship game of the 2000 Women's College World Series, Mims hit .600 for the series and made the All-Tournament team. UCLA also were runners-up in the 2001 Women's College World Series and won the 2003 Women's College World Series. Flowers was a first-team NFCA All-American and first-team All-Pac-10 honoree in 2003.

College Statistics
Sources:

International career
As a member of the United States women's national softball team beginning in 2001, Flowers won gold at the 2002 Women's Softball World Championship, 2003 Pan American Games, 2004 Summer Olympics, 2006 World Cup of Softball, and 2007 Pan American Games and silver at the 2008 Summer Olympics.

Professional playing career
In 2005, Flowers played for the Arizona Heat of National Pro Fastpitch.

Coaching career
In 2006, Flowers was an assistant coach at UC Riverside. From 2007 to 2010, Flowers was an assistant coach at Long Beach State, during which Long Beach State made the NCAA Tournament in 2008 and 2009.

Beginning in 2011, Flowers became head coach at Cal State Northridge. Upon the conclusion of the COVID-19 shortened 2020 season, Flowers had an overall 259-263 record, with her first winning season in 2014 with a 31–26. She is the second-winningest coach in CSUN history. In 2015, Flowers led Cal State Northridge to a 41–17 record (16–5 in the Big West Conference) with an NCAA Tournament appearance and the program's first sole Big West title.  In fall 2020 Flowers was named as the head coach at Loyola Marymount University.

Head coaching record
Sources:

References

External links
 
 
 
 
 

1981 births
Living people
Softball coaches from Arizona
UCLA Bruins softball players
UC Riverside Highlanders softball coaches
Olympic softball players of the United States
Olympic gold medalists for the United States in softball
Olympic silver medalists for the United States in softball
Softball players at the 2004 Summer Olympics
Softball players at the 2008 Summer Olympics
Medalists at the 2004 Summer Olympics
Medalists at the 2008 Summer Olympics
Softball players at the 2007 Pan American Games
Sportspeople from Tucson, Arizona
Softball players from Arizona
Latter Day Saints from Arizona
Cal State Northridge Matadors softball coaches
United States women's national softball team coaches
Pan American Games competitors for the United States